Vimmerby Municipality (Vimmerby kommun) is a municipality in Kalmar County, south-eastern Sweden. Its seat is located in the city of Vimmerby.

Stångån is a small river running through the municipality.

The municipality was created by the local government reform of 1971, when the City of Vimmerby was amalgamated with the surrounding rural municipalities to form an entity of unitary type.

Localities
There are 6 urban areas (also called a Tätort or locality)  in Vimmerby Municipality.

In the table the localities are listed according to the size of the population as of December 31, 2005. The municipal seat is in bold characters.

Government and politics
Distribution of the 49 seats in the municipal council after the 2010 election:

Social Democratic Party   17
Moderate Party   13
Centre Party   9
Christian Democrats   3
Sweden Democrats   2
Green Party   2
Liberal People's Party   1

Results of the 2010 Swedish general election in Vimmerby:

Social Democratic Party   35.6%
Moderate Party   25.6%
Centre Party   12.4%
Sweden Democrats   6.3%
Christian Democrats   6.3%
Green Party   4.6%
Left Party   4.2%
Liberal People's Party   3.9%

Sister cities
Sister cities are cities or towns related to one another in size and history.

Fargo, North Dakota, U.S.
Moorhead, Minnesota, U.S.
Skærbæk, Denmark
Kauhava, Finland
Þorlákshöfn, Iceland
Rygge, Norway
Joniškis, Lithuania

References
Statistics Sweden

External links

Vimmerby Municipality - Official site

Municipalities of Kalmar County